Leo Joseph Brust (January 7, 1916 – January 31, 1995) was the Roman Catholic titular bishop of Suelli who served as an auxiliary bishop of the Roman Catholic Archdiocese of Milwaukee.

Biography
Born in St. Francis, Wisconsin, Brust was ordained to the priesthood on May 30, 1942.

In 1964, in his role as chancellor for the Archdiocese of Milwaukee, Monsignor Brust opposed efforts led by Milwaukee’s black community to integrate the school system by enforcing an order to keep Catholic parishes and schools from participating in a school boycott and then later prohibiting Fr. James Groppi and Fr. William Whelan from participating in the boycott.

On August 22, 1969, Pope Paul VI appointed Brust auxiliary bishop and he was consecrated on October 16, 1969.

Bishop Brust retired on April 16, 1991.

Notes

Religious leaders from Milwaukee
People from Milwaukee County, Wisconsin
20th-century Roman Catholic bishops in the United States
1916 births
1995 deaths
Roman Catholic Archdiocese of Milwaukee
Catholics from Wisconsin